Main Awara Hoon is a 1983 Indian drama film directed by Ashim S. Samanta. The movie, based on a story by late Gulshan Nanda, was the fifth-highest-grossing Hindi film of 1983, with the music by R.D. Burman for the film still being appreciated today. It stars Raj Babbar, Sanjay Dutt, Jaya Prada and Rati Agnihotri.

Cast

 Raj Babbar as Rajeev Kumar
 Sanjay Dutt as Sanjeev Kumar "Sanju"
 Jaya Prada as Bela
 Rati Agnihotri as Archana Prasad
 Shakti Kapoor as Kundan
 Madan Puri as Chandulal
Satyen Kappu as Dinanath Kumar
Iftekhar as Dr. Raashid
Shoma Anand as Shabana Rashid
Rajendra Nath as Sardar Trilochan
 Shubha Khote as Kalawanti
 Dinesh Hingoo as Tahir Khan / Sahir Khan
 Manorama (Hindi actress) as Ruby
Asit Sen as Sen

Soundtrack
Lyrics: Anand Bakshi

References

External links
 

1983 films
1980s Hindi-language films
Films scored by R. D. Burman
Films directed by Ashim Samanta